Marcus Richardson (born September 11, 1984) is a former professional American and Canadian football free agent linebacker. He was signed as an undrafted free agent by the Houston Texans in 2008. He played college football for the Troy Trojans.

Richardson has also been a member of the Indianapolis Colts.

External links
Houston Texans bio

1984 births
Living people
Players of Canadian football from Pensacola, Florida
Players of American football from Pensacola, Florida
American football linebackers
Canadian football linebackers
Troy Trojans football players
Houston Texans players
Indianapolis Colts players
BC Lions players